Ray Mead (1921–1998) was a Canadian abstract expressionist painter and a member of the artists group known as Painters Eleven. In his work, he often used a high horizon line as a structural element.

Early life and career
Born in Watford, United Kingdom, Mead studied under John Nash and Randolph Schwab at the Slade School of Art in London, graduating in 1939. During World War II, he moved to New York where he trained American pilots in combat flying. Sometime around 1943, he went to New York and first saw American abstraction in the work of Stuart Davis. In 1946 he moved to Hamilton, Ontario, where he befriended Hortense Gordon, who with him became a member of Painters Eleven. Later, in Toronto, he worked for Maclaren Advertising as art director. In 1958, Mead moved to Montreal to work at the Maclaren`s branch there, and became associated, through the dealer of his Montreal gallery, Denyse Delrue, with Quebec abstract artists such as Guido Molinari and Claude Tousignant who also showed their work with her. These artists had an influence on him, as did Robert Motherwell. Mead`s finely-tuned work has been called "a dry-martini sort of art". Having returned to Toronto in 1987, he worked continuously until his death in 1998 in Toronto. A posthumous retrospective of his work was held at the Howard Scott Gallery in New York City in 1998.

Painters Eleven

In 1949, Mead met Hortense Gordon in Hamilton and he was included in the Abstracts at Home exhibition held in 1953 at the Robert Simpson Company, Toronto. He joined Painters Eleven when the group was formed later that year. In Canada's conservative art world their early exhibitions were met with disdain. Nevertheless, Painters Eleven attracted U.S. exposure with a successful exhibition in 1956, Twentieth Annual Exhibition of American Abstract Artists with 'Painters Eleven' of Canada, with the American Abstract Artists at the Riverside Museum in New York City, and were praised by the influential critic Clement Greenberg on a visit he paid to Toronto in 1957. In the Canadian press, the group's most ardent supporter was art critic Robert Fulford. The group formally disbanded in 1960.

References

Bibliography
Broad, Graham. "Art Shock in Toronto: Painters Eleven, The Shock of the New." The Beaver, Canada’s History Magazine Vol. 84:1 (2004)
Murray, Joan. Ray Mead: Two Decades: The Robert McLaughlin Gallery, Oshawa, 5–31 January 1982. Oshawa: Robert McLaughlin Gallery, 1981.

External links
 http://www.painters-eleven.com/ray-mead
Christopher Cutts Gallery
Painters Eleven

20th-century Canadian painters
Canadian male painters
Abstract painters
1921 births
1998 deaths
British emigrants to Canada
Canadian abstract artists
Alumni of the Slade School of Fine Art
20th-century Canadian male artists
Canadian collage artists